Plutón B.R.B. Nero is a Spanish science-fiction sitcom television series directed by Álex de la Iglesia. Produced by Pedro Costa and Pánico Films, its two seasons originally aired on La 2 from September 2008 to December 2009.

Production and release 
Regarding the screenwriting, and besides de la Iglesia's recurrent partnership with Jorge Guerricaecheverria, he also collaborated with Pepón Montero and Juan Maidagán, writers of Camera Café.

The first episode premiered on 24 September 2008. Titled El origen de Roswell, it commanded a 5.8% share of audience, above the channel's average. The last episode aired in December 2009.

Premise 
Year 2530. The ship Plutón BRB Nero travels across outer space, seeking to find a habitable planet as the Earth is fully built up.

Cast 
Control room
 Antonio Gil, as Captain Valladares.
 Carlos Areces, as Querejeta, a pilot.
 Carolina Bang, as Lorna, an android.
 Enrique Villén, as Roswell, an alien.
Engine room
 , as Hoffman, a maintenance technician.
 , as Wollensky, an android.
From Earth
 Gracia Olayo, as Merche, Valladares' wife.
 Mariano Venancio, as Macaulay Culkin III, the President.

References 

La 2 (Spanish TV channel) network series
Science fiction comedy
Spanish science fiction television series
Spanish television sitcoms
2008 Spanish television series debuts
2009 Spanish television series endings
Television series set in the 26th century
Television series set in outer space
2000s Spanish comedy television series